Carlos Alberto Solari (born 17 January 1949,), known as Indio Solari, is an Argentine musician and singer. Solari was the leader of Patricio Rey y sus Redonditos de Ricota between 1976 and 2001, and together with "Semilla" Bucciarelli and Skay Beilinson have been the only constant members of the group.

Career 
In the 1970s, Solari met his friend Guillermo Beilinson (Skay's elder brother) in a small fabric printing workshop in Valeria del Mar, called "El Mercurio". By then, Solari was already listed in his city as an enigmatic character by his harsh discourse and unconventional behavior.

In 1976, Solari started a project with Beilinson brothers and various musicians, which would be the beginning of Patricio Rey y sus Redonditos de Ricota, and he remained as singer until the band eventually split in 2001.

After the separation of Los Redondos, Solari started his first solo project in 2004: El Tesoro de los Inocentes (Bingo Fuel), together with his band Los Fundamentalistas del Aire Acondicionado, which was later presented in Argentina and Uruguay.  In December 2007, The Fundamentalistas second album was released: Porco Rex, which was much less complex and very poetic.  In the prologue he says: “Loneliness is the playing yard of Porco Rex”.

In 2010, Solari and his band released El Perfume de la Tempestad, edited on CD and Vinyl.

In late 2013, Solari and Los Fundamentalistas released their fourth studio album: Pajaritos, bravos muchachitos, which includes a song recorded with his old bandmates Semilla Buccarelli, Walter Sidotti and Sergio Dawi.

Discography

With Patricio Rey y sus Redonditos de Ricota 
 Gulp! (1985)
 Oktubre (1986)
 Un Baión para el Ojo Idiota (1987)
 ¡Bang! ¡Bang!!... Estás Liquidado (1989)
 La Mosca y la Sopa (1991)
 En Directo, live (1992)
 Lobo Suelto – Cordero Atado (1993)
 Luzbelito (1996)
 Último Bondi a Finisterre (1998)
 Momo Sampler (2000)

With El Soldado
 Tren de fugitivos (1997)

With Los Fundamentalistas del Aire Acondicionado
 El Tesoro de los Inocentes (Bingo Fuel) (2004)
 Porco Rex (2007)
 El Perfume de la Tempestad (2010)
 Pajaritos, bravos muchachitos (2013)
 El Ruiseñor, El Amor y La Muerte. (2018)

With Lito Vitale
 Escuchame en el Ruido (2006)

With Sergio Dawi
 Estrellados (2008)

With Baltazar Comotto
 Blindado (2011)

References

External links
 
 

1950 births
Living people
Argentine rock singers
Argentine people of Italian descent
20th-century Argentine male singers
Rock en Español musicians
People from Paraná, Entre Ríos